Curtisden Green is a hamlet, lying 3 miles (4.8 km) to the north of Goudhurst, Kent, England.
 It is the location of Bethany School.

References

External links

Villages in Kent